Spencer Charles Hilton Barrett   (born June 7, 1948) is a Canadian evolutionary biologist, formerly a Canada Research Chair at University of Toronto and, in 2010, was named Extraordinary Professor at University of Stellenbosch.

Education
Barrett was educated at the University of Reading and the  University of California, Berkeley, where he was awarded a PhD in 1977 for research into the 	breeding systems of the plants Eichhornia and Pontederia. He was supervised by Herbert Baker.

Research and career
Barrett's interests are in evolutionary biology, evolutionary genetics, evolutionary ecology and plant reproduction. His research seeks understanding of how flowers evolve and what mechanisms are responsible for mating system transitions in flowering plants. Since 2017, he has served as Editor-in-Chief of the Proceedings of the Royal Society series B, the flagship scientific journal of the Royal Society.

Barrett is an evolutionary biologist and a worldwide authority on the ecology and genetics of plant reproduction. His work has focused on increasing understanding of how flowers evolve and the mechanisms responsible for mating system transitions in flowering plants.

Barrett provided the first experimental evidence for the purging of deleterious genes following inbreeding in plants. He also demonstrated that self-fertilization owing to large floral displays in plants can have a detrimental effect on the male fertility of plants.

Barrett’s research group at the University of Toronto focuses on understanding the mechanisms responsible for the evolution of plant mating strategies, and he has edited several leading books in the field.

Awards and honours
Barrett was elected a Fellow of the Royal Society of Canada in 1998 and a Fellow of the Royal Society of London in 2004. He was awarded the Sewall Wright Award by the American Society of Naturalists in 2008 and was President of the Canadian Society for Ecology and Evolution from 2010 to 2011.

He received the Sewall Wright Award from the American Society of Naturalists in 2008 and was President of the Canadian Society for Ecology and Evolution from 2010–2011. In 2014, he received the Flavelle Medal from the Royal Society of Canada.

In April 2020 Spencer Barrett was elected Member of the National Academy of Sciences.

References

1948 births
Living people
UC Berkeley College of Letters and Science alumni
Academic staff of the University of Toronto
Canadian ecologists
Canadian Fellows of the Royal Society
Fellows of the Royal Society of Canada